Marjan Štrukelj (born 24 September 1964 in Nova Gorica) is a Yugoslav-born, Slovenian slalom canoeist who competed from the mid-1980s to the mid-1990s. He won six medals at the ICF Canoe Slalom World Championships with a gold (K1 team: 1989 for Yugoslavia), three silvers (K1: 1991 for Yugoslavia, K1 team: 1987 for Yugoslavia, 1995 for Slovenia) and two bronzes (K1: 1987 for Yugoslavia, K1 team: 1985 for Yugoslavia).

Štrukelj also finished sixth for Slovenia in the K1 event at the 1992 Summer Olympics in Barcelona.

World Cup individual podiums

References

1964 births
Canoeists at the 1992 Summer Olympics
Living people
Olympic canoeists of Slovenia
Slovenian male canoeists
Yugoslav male canoeists
People from Nova Gorica
Medalists at the ICF Canoe Slalom World Championships